Atom Trefl Sopot was a Polish women's volleyball club based in Sopot and playing in the Orlen Liga.

Previous names
Due to sponsorship, the club have competed under the following names:
 Trefl Gdynia (2008–2009)
 Trefl Sopot (2009–2010)
 Atom Trefl Sopot (2010–2014)
 PGE Atom Trefl Sopot (2014–2016)
 Atom Trefl Sopot (2016–2017)

History
The club reached the top Polish league after two seasons, in 2010 and achieved league success shortly after, winning the Championship in 2011–12 and 2012–13. The club proved to be very competitive at the highest national level as on its first six seasons (from 2010 until 2016), apart from the two titles mentioned earlier, it finished the league no lower than third placed. In the same period, it has also reached the Polish Cup finals on four occasions (winning in 2014–15) and was involved in three Polish Super Cups. In international competitions the club has yet to win a title, it has been often featuring in European competitions with a second place at the 2014–15 CEV Cup as its best result.
In 2017 club replaced by Proxima Kraków and changed name on Trefl Proxima Kraków. This new club had promoted from I liga.

Honours

National competitions
  Polish Championship: 2
2011–12, 2012–13

  Polish Cup: 1
2014–15

Team
Season 2016–2017, as of February 2017.

Notable players

  Izabela Bełcik
  Eleonora Dziękiewicz
  Zuzanna Efimienko
  Klaudia Kaczorowska
  Paulina Maj
  Anna Podolec
  Dorota Pykosz
  Magdalena Śliwa
  Dorota Świeniewicz
  Maja Tokarska
  Sylwia Wojcieska
  Mariola Zenik
  Rachel Rourke
  Charlotte Leys
  Érika Coimbra
  Noris Cabrera
 / Kinga Maculewicz
 / Margareta Kozuch
  Corina Ssuschke-Voigt
  Simona Rinieri
  Judith Pietersen
  Olga Fateeva
  Amaranta Fernández
 / Yulia Shelukhina
  Alisha Glass
  Megan Hodge
  Meryem Boz
  Neriman Özsoy
  Kimberly Hill

References

External links

 Official website 

Volleyball clubs established in 2008
2008 establishments in Poland
Women's volleyball teams in Poland
Sport in Sopot